Kenan Yaghi (born 1976) is a Syrian politician. He has been Finance Minister since 2020.

Life and education

 1999-2001: Postgraduate Diploma in business administration from Aleppo University
 2005: Master Degree in Finance from Ayn Shams University in Egypt, high diploma from the American University of Cairo in the establishment and Management of Investment portfolios, Business Management Degree from Aleppo University
 2006-2015: Director of Department of Treasury, Director of Directorate of Banking Operations and Head of State Securities Management in Central Bank of Syria
 2010: PhD in Business Administration, “Investment and Finance” from Damascus University
2015-2020: Deputy Executive Chairman of Damascus Securities Exchange

Career 
Yaghi became Finance Minister in 2020, joining the First Hussein Arnous government.

He was reappointed in 2021, as part of the Second Hussein Arnous government.

References 

Living people
1976 births
21st-century Syrian politicians
Damascus University alumni
Ain Shams University alumni
University of Aleppo alumni
Syrian ministers of finance
People from Salamiyah